Mitten im Leben may refer to:

 Mitten im Leben (comedy TV series)
 Mitten im Leben (reality TV series)
 Mitten im Leben, a 2014 album by Udo Jürgens